This is a list of Important Tangible Folk Cultural Properties of Japan. As of January 25, 2023, there were 226 designated Important Tangible Folk Cultural Properties.

Selection Criteria
Important Tangible Folk Cultural Properties are designated based on the following designation criteria:

Categories
Necessities of life: clothes, accessories, eating and drinking tools, household furnishings and other residential items
Manufacture, livelihood: farming implements, fishing and hunting gear, artisan tools, spinning and weaving equipment, other items related to work
Traffic, transportation, communication: means of transport, boats, express messenger implements and other items related to barriers
Trade, commerce: calculation and measurement tools, signs, licenses, and other shop related items
Social life: gift exchange, implements for guards and judgements, boarding houses
Religious faith: ritual implements, implements for Buddhist mass, votive offerings, idols, magic implements, and other items associated with shrines
Knowledge of folk customs: calendars, implements for fortune telling, medical tools, and other items related to institutional education
Folk entertainment, amusement, games: costumes, implements, musical instruments, masks, dolls, toys, and other items related to the stage
Related to the life of people: upbringing, important celebrations in family relationships, maternity rooms
Annual functions or events: implements for the Japanese New Year, seasonal festivals or the Bon Festival

Criteria
Materials from any of the above categories are then judged based on whether they exemplify:
historical change
a characteristic typical for the period
a regional characteristic
a characteristic of the level of life
a functional aspect

Statistics

Designated cultural properties

Necessities of life

Manufacture, livelihood

Traffic, transportation, communication

Trade, commerce

Social life

Religious faith

Knowledge of folk customs

Folk entertainment, amusement, games

Related to the life of people

Annual functions or events

Notes

General

Architecture

References
General

Notes

Japanese culture
Japanese folk art
Important Tangible Folk Cultural Properties